A hereditary monarchy is a form of government and succession of power in which the throne passes from one member of a ruling family to another member of the same family. A series of rulers from the same family would constitute a dynasty.

It is historically the most common type of monarchy and remains the dominant form in extant monarchies. It has the advantages of continuity of the concentration of power and wealth and predictability of who one can expect to control the means of governance and patronage. Provided that a monarch is competent, not oppressive, and maintains an appropriate dignity, it might also offer the stabilizing factors of popular affection for and loyalty to a ruling family. The adjudication of what constitutes oppressive, dignified and popular tends to remain in the purview of the monarch. A major disadvantage of hereditary monarchy arises when the heir apparent may be physically or temperamentally unfit to rule. Other disadvantages include the inability of a people to choose their head of state, the ossified distribution of wealth and power across a broad spectrum of society, and the continuation of outmoded religious and social-economic structures mainly for the benefit of monarchs, their families, and supporters.

In most extant hereditary monarchies, the typical order of succession uses some form of primogeniture, but there exist other methods such as seniority and tanistry (in which an heir-apparent is nominated from among qualified candidates).

Research shows that hereditary regimes, in particular primogeniture, are more stable than forms of authoritarian rule with alternative succession arrangements.

Succession

Theoretically, when the monarch of a hereditary monarchy dies or abdicates, the crown typically passes to the next generation of the family. If no qualified child exists, the crown may pass to a brother, sister, nephew, niece, cousin, or other relative, in accordance with a predefined order of succession, often enshrined in legislation. Such a process establishes who will be the next monarch beforehand and avoids disputes among members of the royal family. Usurpers may resort to inventing semi-mythical genealogies to bolster their respectability.

Historically, there have been differences in systems of succession, mainly revolving around the question of whether succession is limited to males, or whether females are also eligible (historically, the crown often devolved on the eldest male child, as ability to lead an army in battle was a requisite of kingship). Agnatic succession refers to systems where females are neither allowed to succeed nor to transmit succession rights to their male descendants (see Salic Law). An agnate is a kinsman with whom one has a common ancestor by descent in an unbroken male line. Cognatic succession once referred to any succession which allowed both males and females to be heirs, although in modern usage it specifically refers to succession by seniority regardless of sex (absolute primogeniture as in Sweden since 1980). Another factor which may be taken into account is the religious affiliation of the candidate or the candidate's spouse, specifically where the monarch also has a religious title or role; for example, the British monarch has the title of Supreme Governor of the Church of England and may not profess Roman Catholicism.

Elective hereditary monarchy
Elective monarchy can function as de facto hereditary monarchy. A specific type of elective monarchy known as tanistry limits eligibility to members of the ruling house. But hereditary succession can also occur in practice despite any such legal limitations.  For example, if the majority of electors belong to the same house, then they may elect only family members. Or a reigning monarch might have sole power to elect a relative. Many late-medieval countries of Europe were officially elective monarchies, but in fact pseudo-elective; most transitioned into officially hereditary systems in the early modern age. Exceptions include the Holy Roman Empire and the Polish–Lithuanian Commonwealth.

See also

 List of hereditary monarchies
 Heir presumptive

References 

 
Succession